Vitoc District is one of six districts of the province Chanchamayo in Peru.

See also 
 Chiri Yaku

References